This is a list of disasters in China by death toll.

Earthquake
A full list in chronological order is detailed in the list of earthquakes in China. Among which, the most fatal ones were:

Famine
A full list in chronological order is detailed in the list of famines in China. Among which, the most fatal ones were:

Fire
A full list in chronological order is detailed in the list of fires in China. Among which, the most fatal ones were:

Flood
A full list in chronological order is detailed in the list of floods in China. Among which, the most fatal ones were:

Massacres
A full list in chronological order is detailed in the list of massacres in China. Due to lack of precise figures in the past, here only list the most fatal ones in the 20th century.

References

 
China
Disasters